ROKS Seoul is the name of three Republic of Korea Navy warships:

 , a landing craft infantry commissioned as USS LCI(L)-594 in 1944, and acquired 15 September 1946
 , an  commissioned on 14 December 1985

Republic of Korea Navy ship names